A current database is a conventional database that stores data that is valid now. 

For example, if a user inserts "John Smith" into the Staff table of a current database, this asserts that the fact is valid now and until it is subsequently deleted. By contrast, a temporal database qualifies each row with a valid time stamp, valid time period or valid time interval. For example, we can assert the fact that "John Smith" was a member of staff during the period 1 June 2001 and now. As of 2006, current databases were the most common type of database in use. The concept of now is discussed in Clifford et alia (1997).

References

External links

Types of databases